Compton Abbas is a village and civil parish in north Dorset, England. It is sited on greensand strata on the edge of the Blackmore Vale, below the chalk downs of Cranborne Chase. On top of these hills is Compton Abbas Airfield. The A350 road between Wiltshire and the south coast passes through the village. In the 2011 census the civil parish had a population of 216. The name Compton Abbas derives from the Saxon "cumb-ton", meaning 'village in a narrow valley', plus "abbas" which refers to Shaftesbury Abbey (the land was owned by the abbess). The church, St. Mary's, was built in 1866 to replace the older structure which was more remote from the village.

The tower of the Church of St Mary in East Compton is a Grade I listed building.

References

External links 

Villages in Dorset
Civil parishes in Dorset